Alice Williams Brotherton (Williams; April 4, 1848 – February 9, 1930) was an American author of poetry, essays, reviews, children's stories, and lyrics. Though she hailed from Indiana, she lived most of her life in Cincinnati, Ohio, serving as president of the Cincinnati Woman's Press Club. She wrote critical essays and addresses on Shakespeare, while many of her poems were set to music in the United States and in England. Contemporary poets of Ohio included Helen L. Bostwick  and Kate Brownlee Sherwood.

Early life and education
Alice Williams was born in Cambridge City, Indiana, April 4, 1848. Her parent were Ruth Dodge Johnson Williams and Alfred Baldwin Williams, of Cincinnati. Her family was of Welsh and English descent, with six generations on United States soil. Her father resided in Cincinnati, Ohio, and afterward in St. Louis, Missouri, then in Cambridge, Indiana, and again settled in Cincinnati.

Living as a child in an atmosphere of books, Brotherton was trained in composition at an early age by her mother. She was educated in various private schools, in the St. Louis Eliot Grammar School, and Woodward High School, of Cincinnati, graduating from that institution in 1870.

Career

Brotherton's first appearance in print was in 1872. Though her specialty was poetry, she wrote considerable prose in the form of essays, reviews and children's stories. Her work showed a wide range of feeling and a deep insight into varying phases of life. Writing only in the spare moments of a busy home life, she contributed at intervals to a variety of periodicals, including The Century Magazine, Scribner's Magazine, The Atlantic Monthly, St. Nicholas Magazine, Poet Lore, and The New York Independent, as well as various religious journals. 

She was the author of three published volumes: Beyond the Veil (poems, 1886); The Sailing of King Olaf, and Other Poems, (1887); and What the Wind Told the Tree-Tops (prose and verse for children, 1888). A number of her lyrics, among which are those entitled "Rosenlied," "The Song of Fleeting Love," "The Fisher-Wife's Lullabye," "Unawares," "Boys, Keep the Colors Up," "God Knows," and "June Roses," were set to music, in the U.S. and in England.

From 1892, she devoted much of her time to the preparation of critical essays and addresses on Shakespeare, the drama, and other literary topics, delivering numerous lectures before study clubs, women's clubs, and dramatic schools.

She served several times as president of the Cincinnati Woman's Press Club.

Personal life
On October 18, 1876, she married William Ernest Brotherton (1851-1949), of Cincinnati. They had three children, two sons and one daughter; the older son died in 1890, at the age of eleven. Brotherton was a non-conservative Unitarian. 

Alice Williams Brotherton died in Cincinnati, February 9, 1930.

Selected works

  1886, Beyond the veil
  1887, What the wind told to the tree-tops
  1887, The sailing of King Olaf : and other poems
  1894, The buckeye song
  1895, New year's eve
  ca. 1900–1920, Heap high the board with plenteous cheer
  1905, The real Hamlet and the Hamlet oldest of all
  n.d., Debasing the Poetic Coinage the Quality and Function of Poetry
  n.d., "Debasing the Poetic Coinage". Part II: The "New Movement" in America
  n.d., The talisman

References

Attribution

Bibliography

External links
 
 

1848 births
1930 deaths
19th-century American women writers
19th-century American poets
American women poets
People from Cambridge City, Indiana
Woodward High School (Cincinnati, Ohio) alumni
Wikipedia articles incorporating text from A Woman of the Century